John J. Cronin is a Massachusetts state senator representing the Worcester and Middlesex district since 2021.

Political career 
Cronin entered politics in 2020 to run for the Worcester and Middlesex State Senate seat against incumbent Republican Dean Tran. John is the youngest current member of the Massachusetts State Senate. He had no previous political experience but had a background in legal advocacy. His campaign focused on equitable investments in education, workforce development, and transportation. He contrasted his leadership background as an infantry officer against his opponent's ethics scandals and was unopposed in the Democratic Primary. Cronin won the general by 1227  votes, returning the moderate district to Democratic representation for first time since Jennifer Flannagan's appointment to the cannabis control commission. His senatorial district comprises Berlin, Bolton, Precincts 1 & 2 of Clinton, Fitchburg, Gardner, Lancaster, Leominster, Lunenburg, Sterling, Townsend and Westminster in north central Massachusetts.

Leadership and Committees 

 Chairperson, Joint Committee on Municipalities and Regional Government
 Vice Chair, Joint Committee on Tourism, Arts and Cultural Development
 Joint Committee on Community Development and Small Businesses
 Joint Committee on Economic Development and Emerging Technologies
 Joint Committee on Education
 Joint Committee on State Administration and Regulatory Oversight

Military career 
Cronin graduated from the United States Military Academy at West Point and commissioned as an army officer in 2013. A combat veteran, he served two tours in Afghanistan and reached the rank of captain.

Personal life 
He was born in Leominster and grew up in neighboring Lunenburg and Fitchburg.

See also
 2021–2022 Massachusetts legislature
 2020 Massachusetts Senate election

References 

https://malegislature.gov/Legislators/Profile/JJC0

Democratic Party Massachusetts state senators
Year of birth missing (living people)
Living people
Military personnel of the War in Afghanistan (2001–2021)
People from Lunenburg, Massachusetts